David Adams (27 June 1871 – 16 August 1943) was a British Labour politician who served as the Member of Parliament (MP) for Newcastle upon Tyne West from 1922 to 1923, and Consett from 1935 until his death in 1943.

Career
He was educated at the School of Art and Science at Newcastle's Armstrong College. He took up a career as an engineer with the local shipping company of D. Adams and Company and the Anglo-Scottish Trading Company. He was elected to Newcastle City Council in 1902, and held the office of Sheriff from 1922 to 1923 and Lord Mayor from 1930 to 1931.

At the 1918 general election, he was an unsuccessful candidate in the new Newcastle upon Tyne West constituency, losing to the Liberal Party cabinet minister Edward Shortt. Shortt stood down at the 1922 general election, and Adams won the seat with a majority of only 156 over the National Liberal candidate Cecil Ramage. At the 1923 general election, Ramage took the seat from Adams with a majority of over 3,500.

Adams unsuccessfully contested City of York at the 1924 general election and Barrow-in-Furness at the 1931 contest. He returned to the House of Commons following the 1935 general election as the MP for Consett, County Durham, gaining a majority of 7,522 over the National Liberals. Following his death, Adams was succeeded by James Glanville in the 1943 Consett by-election.

Personal life
Adams married Elizabeth Havelock Patterson in 1897; the couple had two sons and a daughter.

Death
He died at his home at Jesmond, Newcastle on 16 August 1943, aged 72.

References

External links
 

1871 births
1943 deaths
Amalgamated Engineering Union-sponsored MPs
Labour Party (UK) MPs for English constituencies
UK MPs 1922–1923
UK MPs 1935–1945
Councillors in Tyne and Wear
Mayors of Newcastle upon Tyne